Talcher is one of the 4 sub-divisions of Angul district in the Indian state of Odisha.

History
During the British Raj Talcher was the capital of Talcher State, one of the princely states of the Eastern States Agency.

Demographics
 India census, Talcher had a population of 40,841 . Males constitute 55% of the population and females 45%. Talcher has an average literacy rate of 75%, higher than the national average of 59.5%: male literacy is 80%, and female literacy is 62%. In Talcher, 12% of the population is under 6 years of age.

References

Cities and towns in Angul district